Cuisine of Montevideo refers to the food cooked and served in the city of Montevideo, Uruguay. The cuisine served in this city is similar to the one served throughout the whole country of Uruguay, with beef being a staple of the diet along with the torta frita, a pan-fried cake. 

In recent years the number of restaurants and the diversity of cuisine has increased considerably, Lonely Planet describes the Montevideo culinary scene as "just starting to get exciting" with a variety of restaurants within the city, expanding from traditional Uruguayan cuisine to Japanese cuisine and Middle Eastern cuisine.

Cuisine
A torta frita is a pan-fried cake consumed in Montevideo and throughout Uruguay. It is usually circular, with a small cut in the centre for even cooking, and is made from wheat flour, yeast, water and sugar or salt. Beef is very important in Uruguayan cuisine and an essential part of many dishes. Many of the restaurants serve beef steaks, pork or chicken dishes. Given that Montevideo is a coastal city, it has a plentiful supply of fresh fish. Some restaurants, like Che Montevideo on the Rambla Gandhi in the Pocitos area of the city, specialise in fresh seafood.

Mercado del Puerto

The historic centre of traditional food and beverage in Montevideo is the Mercado del Puerto ("Port Market"), which contains restaurants and cafes catering to international visitors. The La Palenque restaurant serves Uruguayan and Spanish cuisine with a variety of lamb, pork and cold meats dishes with vegetables, paella, rice and shellfish. Additionally, the market is host to various cultural events on Saturdays.

The Mercado del Puerto is the city's most famous area for parillas (barbecues). The open-aired building which houses the market was built in 1868. While originally a venue for fresh produce, it is now filled with parillas. The structure was built in the style of a nineteenth-century British Railway station. It is listed among "The Best Markets" in South America by Frommer's.

Restaurants

Montevideo has a variety of restaurants, from traditional Uruguayan cuisine to Japanese cuisine such as sushi. Western fast-food chains such as McDonald's, and  Burger King are present in the city.

The Restaurante Arcadia, on the 25th floor of the Radisson Montevideo Victoria Plaza Hotel,
is considered Montevideo's best restaurant. El Fogon is more popular with the late-night diners of the city. Its interior is brightly lit and the walls covered with big mirrors. Officially a barbecue and seafood restaurant, it serves grilled meat dishes, as well as salmon, shrimp and calamari. 

Kokoro is a Japanese restaurant located on Viejo Pancho in the barrio of Pocitos. It serves traditional Japanese cuisine, mainly dishes with meat and fish to suit the Uruguayan palette. 

Panini's is a notable Italian restaurant located in the Ciudad Vieja historical area of the city, just off the Plaza Independencia. It is noted in particular for its "degustación de pastas", described as "a veritable smorgasbord of noodley delights."

Also of note is Rara Avis in the east wing of the Solís Theatre, a branch of the Uruguayan chain of restaurants called La Pasiva in the Centro area which serves pastas and meat dishes, and the restaurants in the Mercado del Puerto and the Mercado de la Abundancia.

Bars and pubs

Many of the notable bars in the city are located in the barrio of Pocitos near the sea. 

Many bars and pubs are located inside community markets. Customers at markets may sit at bars to order sausages, offal, asado, and other meats that are being grilled right in front of them. Meats, especially cheap cuts of beef and pork such as sausages and organs, are a large part of the ordinary diet in Montevideo. The various meats are served with simple side dishes such as crusty bread, tapenades, fried potatoes, and tapas. During lunch, local lager beer is the most common choice of accompaniment, although soft drinks such as colas are widely available. In addition to having bars and pubs, markets in Montevideo also sell fresh produce, mate, coffee, kitchenware, and other basic consumer goods.

Former world record barbecue
On 13 April 2008, 12,500 cooks in Montevideo together grilled  of beef, setting a new Guinness world record. The barbecue surpassed the previous record of 8 tonnes, which was set by Mexico in 2006. Montevideo's record held until March 2011, when  of beef were grilled in General Pico in Argentina.

References

Further reading
Vamos a comer / Let’s eat, by The American Women’s Club of Montevideo. 1995.
ARCIA, M. C. (1970). Food habits of a moderate income group of 50 Uruguayan women. Thesis (M.S.)--Pennsylvania State University.
GARCÍA ROBLES, H. (2005). El mantel celeste: historia y recetario de la cocina uruguaya. [Montevideo, Uruguay, Ediciones de la Banda Oriental.}
NÚÑEZ, T. (2008). La cocina uruguaya: orígenes y recetas. Uruguay, Placer, La primera revista uruguay del buen vivir.
WIZO URUGUAY. (1991). Wizo cocina con Herminia. Montevideo, WIZO Uruguay.
M. DE GINERMAN, S. (2002). El sabor de los recuerdos: cocina judía y tradición. Montevideo, Uruguay, Ediciones Trilce.
   

Culture in Montevideo
Montevideo
Montevideo